Elizabeth Debbie Eden (August 19, 1946 – September 29, 1987) was an American trans woman whose husband John Wojtowicz attempted a bank robbery allegedly to pay for her sex reassignment surgery. The incident was made into the crime drama film Dog Day Afternoon (1975), directed by Sidney Lumet. The character Leon Shermer, played by Chris Sarandon, is loosely based on Eden.

Biography

Early life 
Eden was born on August 19, 1946, in Ozone Park, Queens. Eden was Jewish.

Relationship with Wojtowicz 
In 1971, she and Wojtowicz met at the Feast of San Gennaro in New York City. The two, Elizabeth in a bridal gown and John in military attire, wed in a public ceremony that year. The wedding received widespread attention in local media, even being featured on a segment of Walter Cronkite's news show, CBS Evening News.

Following a series of suicide attempts, which Wojtowicz attributed to Eden's despondency over her inability to afford gender-reassignment surgery, Eden was admitted to a psychiatric institution.

The following year, on August 22, 1972, Wojtowicz attempted to rob a Chase Manhattan bank branch in Gravesend, Brooklyn. He claimed that he attempted the robbery in order to obtain funds so that Eden could have surgery. However, the claim was disputed by some, with Arthur Bell, a respected Village Voice columnist and investigative journalist who knew Wojtowicz, stating that the robbery was due to Wojtowicz's debts to the Mafia. Wojtowicz had also previously expressed opposition to Eden's desire to undergo surgery. Eden was not aware of the plan. Wojtowicz was sentenced to 20 years, but released in 1978. Wojtowicz did two more stretches in prison for parole violations in 1984 and 1986-87. He said he was released in April 1987, and Eden visited him in New York about once a month.

The film Dog Day Afternoon shows Sonny (the Wojtowicz character) making out a will to give Leon (Eden's character) his life insurance so that even if he were killed, "Leon" could pay for the operation. The real-life Wojtowicz was paid $7500, plus 1% of the film's net profits, for the rights to his story, from which he gave Eden enough money to pay for the surgery.

Later life 
Following her sex reassignment surgery, Eden legally married someone else, then divorced.

Eden died of AIDS-related pneumonia on September 29, 1987, aged 41, at Genesee Hospital in Rochester, New York, after contracting the virus through a blood transfusion following a car accident.

Legacy
Her personal papers and photographs were donated posthumously to the National Archive of Lesbian, Gay, Bisexual & Transgender History at the Lesbian, Gay, Bisexual & Transgender Community Center (New York) on June 14, 1990.

She appeared in the Drunk History episode "Love" telling the story of her and Wojtowicz's romance and the robbery that followed it; she was portrayed by trans actress Trace Lysette.

References

External links
Liz Eden (Ernest Aron) Papers  via LGBT Community Center New York

1946 births
1987 deaths
AIDS-related deaths in New York (state)
LGBT people from New York (state)
Transgender women
People from Ozone Park, Queens
Deaths from pneumonia in New York (state)
20th-century American LGBT people
American Jews